Graeme Ede (born 7 February 1960 in Southbridge, New Zealand) is a shooting competitor for New Zealand. At the 2006 Commonwealth Games he won a gold medal in the Shooting - Trap event. He previously competed at the 1994 Commonwealth Games in Victoria, British Columbia, Canada.

At the 2008 Beijing Olympics, he finished 18th in qualification in Double Trap and 20th in qualification for Trap.

References

1960 births
Living people
New Zealand male sport shooters
Olympic shooters of New Zealand
Shooters at the 1994 Commonwealth Games
Shooters at the 2006 Commonwealth Games
Commonwealth Games gold medallists for New Zealand
Shooters at the 2008 Summer Olympics
People from Southbridge, New Zealand
Commonwealth Games medallists in shooting
Sportspeople from Canterbury, New Zealand
20th-century New Zealand people
21st-century New Zealand people
Medallists at the 2006 Commonwealth Games